Tulyehualco is a Mexican football club that plays in the  Tercera División de México. The club is based in Puebla city, Puebla and plays its home games at the Centro Escolar Niños Héroes de Chaputepe, which adjoins the Estadio Cuauhtémoc.

See also
Football in Mexico

References

External links
Official page

Football clubs in Puebla
Association football clubs established in 1945
1945 establishments in Mexico